Christopher William Farnell (born 21 December 1969) is an English solicitor. Farnell owns the Manchester-based legal practice IPS Law. He is a sports lawyer, also working in media and entertainment-related law. Farnell has worked for boxers, international footballers and managers, Premier League and English Football League clubs and European football agents.

Biography

Career and sports law
Farnell studied economics at Liverpool University where he gained a 2:1 in economics before he studied law. Farnell was signed to Blackburn Rovers, but was unable to continue his career due to an injury.

Farnell worked at Eversheds before, in 2004, becoming a partner at Hill Dickinson, then founded and established IPS Law LLP in 2006 as a niche sports law practice.

Farnell gained a reputation in sports law for  representing players and managers and in particular his work on image rights.
IPS specialises in image rights, player transfers, intellectual property contracts, contract re-negotiations, sponsorship and endorsement contracts, defamation, sports dispute resolution, footballer and agent disputes, doping hearings, regulatory issues, and both contentious and non-contentious intellectual property law. Farnell has been involved in the purchases of several professional football clubs.

Wigan Athletic
Farnell was a club director between March and June 2013 of Wigan Athletic coinciding with the club's 2013 FA Cup Final win and Premier League relegation. His directorship was ended on the same day as manager Roberto Martinez left to join Everton.

Leeds United
Farnell advised Massimo Cellino during his 2014 takeover of Leeds United. Farnell reportedly sacked Leeds United manager Brian McDermott by telephone on behalf of the club's prospective new owner, Cellino.

Swansea City
Farnell was the lead lawyer on the 2016 sale of Swansea City to new owners; on the sale of the club, and was later accused by former director Steve Penny, who wanted to profit from the sale of the club, of bullying and intimidation during a board meeting, to make him leave. The judge found that these claims were unsupported. Penny and fellow director Don Keefe won their claim of unfair dismissal.

Charlton Athletic

Farnell came under scrutiny for his involvement in the Charlton Athletic takeover deal with Paul Elliott. He was invited to advise the board by owner Tahnoon Neimer, successfully removing Matt Southall as chairman. He was present when police were called to The Valley as tensions rose. His involvement continued until Farnell subsequently found himself professionally unable to continue with instructions due to the club being sold. The takeover was for the transfer of shares from Panorama Magic, which owned 65% of East Street Investments, where Farnell was a director, to Lex Dominius, of which Farnell was a director, whilst representing Charlton Athletic.

Burnley
Farnell was interested in purchasing Burnley along with Mohamed El Kashashy. El Kashashy was also rumoured to be part of a takeover of Charlton Athletic in 2020, and had completed a sales and purchasing agreement for Burnley. However, in December 2020 they pulled out of a potential deal.

Personal life
In February 2014, Farnell was found not guilty of assaulting his first wife Rebecca, with whom he had four children. In September 2015, Farnell was cleared of two counts of perjury relating to transfers involving Bolton Wanderers in 2007.

He is now married to his second wife Clare and lives in Mobberley, Cheshire.

References

External links
 

Living people
1969 births
Sports law
Association football law